The 2010 Malaysian Grand Prix (formally the 2010 Formula 1 Petronas Malaysian Grand Prix) was the third round in the 2010 Formula One season. It was held in Sepang, Malaysia on 4 April 2010.

The race was won by Sebastian Vettel leading a one-two finish for the Red Bull-Renault team with Mark Webber coming in second place.

Report

Qualifying

Mark Webber took pole position for Red Bull Racing, on a wet and wild day of Qualifying for the Malaysian Grand Prix. The brave switch Webber made to intermediate tyres, after a delay during Q3, as a heavy storm lashed the circuit, proved pivotal – as the track started to dry in the last moments of qualifying.

The weather provided numerous high-profile casualties during the early period of the session, as both McLaren and Ferrari drivers inexplicably opted to remain in their garages while the rest of the field set banker laps, before the rain arrived. By the time they made their way onto the track, the rain had set in, and it proved impossible to complete a lap good enough to make it into Q2.

Jenson Button had set a lap time that was good enough to advance from Q1, but he ended up beached in the gravel, meaning that he would not take his place in Q2.

Mercedes GP team principal, Ross Brawn, believes that Saturday's wet qualifying session proved that teams rely too much on sophisticated weather radars, and do not use enough common sense when it comes to assessing the conditions.

"We learned a lesson there, because we almost got caught out,” he said.

“It [the radar] was so definitive that there wouldn’t be any rain for the rest of the session.

Race 

Prior to the race, Pedro de la Rosa's engine failed as the cars were making their way from the pit lane to their grid positions, and so he did not even take the formation lap.

At the start, Sebastian Vettel starting from third, got past Nico Rosberg immediately on the straight, and at the first corner came up the inside of polesitter and teammate Mark Webber to take the lead. Webber challenged in the next corner but Vettel held firm. Robert Kubica and Michael Schumacher also gained two places, and were fourth and sixth respectively. Rubens Barrichello who started seventh stalled on the grid and was last at the end of the first lap. Both McLarens and both Ferraris charged up the field from their lowly grid positions after failing to properly read the conditions in qualifying. Lewis Hamilton had got up from 20th to 13th, Felipe Massa from 21st to 14th, Jenson Button from 17th to 15th, and Fernando Alonso from 19th to 16th. At the end of lap 1, the top 10 were: Vettel, Webber, Rosberg, Kubica, Adrian Sutil, Schumacher, Nico Hülkenberg, Vitantonio Liuzzi, Vitaly Petrov and Kamui Kobayashi. Timo Glock retired on lap three after a collision with Jarno Trulli.

Hamilton was on a charge, and soon was up to 10th within 4 laps, passing a car a lap. The Ferraris and Button could not get past Sébastien Buemi's Toro Rosso and were stuck with Massa 14th, Alonso 15th (having passed Button) and Button 16th. On the fifth lap, Hamilton passed Vitaly Petrov for ninth at the final turn, but Petrov came back at him at the back straight and regained the position. Two laps later, Hamilton once again passed Petrov at the final corner, however then weaved 4 times from side to side along the start finish straight in an effort to break the tow. He failed to do so as Petrov followed tightly behind and made an attempt to pass back at the first corner which did not succeed. Hamilton's manoeuvre of crossing from side to side 4 times courted controversy, dividing race pundits and drivers alike as to whether it was in breach of the regulations regarding the blocking of an overtake. The race stewards investigated the incident and issued Hamilton with a warning.

Kobayashi, Schumacher and Liuzzi retired in quick succession on laps 8,9 and 12 with engine, loose wheel nut and throttle failures respectively. This left the top 10 as: Vettel, Webber, Rosberg, Kubica, Sutil, Hülkenberg, Hamilton, Jaime Alguersuari, Massa and Alonso. Button had passed Alonso on lap 9, but then immediately pitted to change to the harder tyres. He was the first man to pit. He resumed on a clear track, and immediately set the fastest lap of the race, with a 1:41.044. Hülkenberg soon pitted, releasing Hamilton, who immediately ran under 1:41, setting a 1:40.9 on lap 16. He had improved that to a 1:40.4 by lap 20, when Rosberg, Kubica, and Sutil all pitted. The Red Bulls stayed out until laps 24 and 25, with Vettel coming in first. He rejoined side by side with Hamilton, but got ahead taking the inside line on Turn 1. Webber's pit stop was not as smooth, with a problem on his wheelnut costing him 2 seconds, and he rejoined 4 seconds behind teammate Vettel, with Hamilton in between. Vettel immediately got into the 1:39s with a lap of 1:39.854. Webber responded by going two tenths quicker on the next lap. The top 10 at the end of lap 26 were: Vettel, Hamilton, Webber, Rosberg, Kubica, Massa, Alonso, Sutil, Button, and Hülkenberg.

The three drivers who started on hard tyres—Hamilton, Massa, and Alonso—were the only top drivers who had not pitted. Massa pitted on lap 27 from sixth and rejoined ninth, just ahead of Hülkenberg. Massa, on the softs, and with clear track, immediately went over a second quicker than anyone else. On lap 28, he set a 1:38.002, a second and a half faster than the previous fastest lap. Hamilton followed suit, pitting on lap 31 from second. He rejoined seventh, just ahead of teammate Button. He immediately closed in on Sutil like a rocket, setting a new fastest lap of 1:37.745. By lap 34, he was right behind Sutil. Massa similarly was closing in on Button. Alonso was the last of the frontrunners to pit, on lap 37. He rejoined in ninth, behind Massa. He did what Massa and Hamilton did before, on the new softs, setting a string of fastest laps, the last being a 1:37.231 on lap 41, half a second quicker than anyone else, allowing him to close a gap of over 10 seconds to Massa and Button in five laps.

Massa passed Button on lap 46 at the first corner, taking seventh place. He set about closing in on Hamilton, who was unable to pass Sutil. His lap times decreased by a second, but his tyres were 20 laps old, and he did not go as quickly as he had before. Alonso had been battling a gearbox problem for the entire race, and this affected his ability to pass Button. He made an attempt on lap 48, and then on the penultimate lap of the race, tried at Turn 1 and went wide. Alonso's engine then blew up, and he was out of the race from ninth. Also, on lap 53, Webber set a new fastest lap, 1:37.054.

Vettel took the chequered flag ahead of Webber, leading a Red Bull one-two, with Rosberg completing the podium in third. Kubica was fourth, Sutil held off Hamilton for fifth, and Massa and Button got seventh and eighth after gritty drives from the back. Alguersuari and Hülkenberg rounded out the point-scoring finishes, both scoring their first points in Formula One. Alguersuari's points made him the second youngest points scorer in Formula One history. Further back, Virgin got their first ever finish with Lucas di Grassi 14th and HRT got both their cars to the finish line for the first time, with Karun Chandhok 15th and Bruno Senna 16th. Jarno Trulli was last of the 17 classified finishers, having suffered hydraulic problems, although his teammate Heikki Kovalainen was still running at the end. He had pitted during the race with hydraulic issues and resumed nine laps adrift of the leader. He circulated six laps behind his nearest rival and did not complete enough laps to be classified as a finisher, ultimately taking the chequered flag ten laps down.

Classification

Qualifying

Race 

Notes:
1. – Fernando Alonso retired, but was classified as he had completed over 90% of the winner's race distance.

Championship standings after the race

Drivers' Championship standings

Constructors' Championship standings

 Note: Only the top five positions are included for both sets of standings.

References

External links

Malaysian Grand Prix
Malaysia
Grand Prix
April 2010 sports events in Asia